TR5 or some variant thereof, may represent:

 Triumph TR5, a British sports car
 Triumph TR5 Trophy, a British motorcycle
 TR.5 aero engine, see Avro Canada Orenda
 Travan TR-5, computer tape storage cartridge
 TR5, a postal district in the TR postcode area